A secretagogue is a substance that causes another substance to be secreted. The word comes from Greek agōgos, meaning "a leader" or "bringer"; thus "something that brings secretions". The same root is seen in completely unrelated words such as pedagogue and demagogue. These are people who "bring in" children [pedos] and general public [demos] respectively. The former now refers to a good teacher, and latter [rather derogatorily] to a leader.

One example is gastrin, which stimulates the H/K ATPase in the parietal cells (increased gastric acid production by the stomach). Pentagastrin, a synthetic gastrin, histamine, and acetylcholine are also gastric secretagogues.

Insulin secretagogues, such as sulfonylureas, trigger insulin release by direct action on the KATP channel of the pancreatic beta cells. Blockage of this channel leads to depolarization and secretion of vesicles.

Angiotensin II is a secretagogue for aldosterone from the adrenal gland.

References

External links
 

Endocrinology